Most Dangerous Game is an American action series created by Nick Santora, Josh Harmon and Scott Elder that debuted on Quibi on April 6, 2020. It is inspired by the 1924 short story "The Most Dangerous Game" by Richard Connell. On May 20, 2021, the series was released on the Roku Channel. On August 23, 2021, it was renewed for a second season on the Roku Channel. In May 2022, Amazon Prime Video started streaming a compiled version of the episodes as a 2 hour 7 minute feature film. On March 10, 2023 the second season premiered, consisting of 12 episodes.

Plot

Season one
Dodge Tynes is a former athlete and a bankrupt real estate developer living in Detroit. After passing out from a headache, he wakes up in the hospital where two doctors tell him and his pregnant wife Val that he has an inoperable brain tumor. A nurse offers him a business card for Tiro Fund, a company that supposedly helps those with terminal illnesses that are financially struggling.

Dodge visits Tiro Fund and meets Miles Sellars, who offers him a deal: for 24 hours, Dodge will be the "prey" hunted by five "hunters" that will try to kill him. In exchange, he will have money wired to his bank account for every hour he survives, with the increments growing for every hour up to 24.5 million dollars. Miles also explains the rules: Dodge cannot stop or pause the game once it starts; he cannot tell anyone he is in the game; and he cannot leave the city. If he breaks these rules, the game will never end until he dies. Dodge initially rejects the offer, but later decides to take it at the promise of leaving Val and their child financially secure. The game starts at sunrise at 6:46 AM at a diner where Miles takes all of Dodge's belongings except for his medication, an ultrasound of his child, and a phone Miles gives him to track his location. For 15 seconds every hour, the phone will send his current location to the hunters.

The game begins, and Dodge eventually comes across and evades the five hunters: Nixon, a British gentleman who strictly follows the rules of the hunt; Reagan, a southern cowboy; Carter, a psychologist who uses Dodge's profile to track his next move; Kennedy, a martial arts expert; and LBJ, an older man. Dodge also runs into Connell, one of Miles' subordinates in charge of watching Dodge from the streets and cleaning up after the game.

Meanwhile, Val uses Dodge's laptop and discovers a total of $300,000 deposited to his account. When Dodge does not answer her calls, she gets suspicious. She calls the police, but they are unable to file a missing person's report. Val later finds the Tiro Fund card, but finds the company's office empty. Dodge tries to go back home, and Dodge's wife sees him, but Carter chases after him. After a chase, Dodge kills Carter with a cinderblock. Dodge's friend Looger finds Dodge, but Dodge escapes when Nixon follows them.

Later, after his phone reveals his location, a shootout takes place and LBJ is killed while Reagan is injured. Dodge goes to the hospital where a nurse confirms that his medicine is fake and that there are no records of him ever being admitted there. He calls Miles, who admits that Dodge does not have a terminal illness and had been set up to accept the game. Miles reveals that Looger accepted $50,000 to drug Dodge and explains that the rules still stand. Val is kidnapped and taken to Miles as hostage.

Dodge sets traps for Nixon, Reagan, and Kennedy in a construction shop. The three of them arrive, but Looger shoots Kennedy when she tries to kill Dodge. Dodge blows up the shop, killing Reagan, but Nixon escapes. When Connell arrives to clean up the mess, Dodge attacks him and demands to know where Val is. Connell reveals Miles had set up their base at The Carrington, Dodge's failed high-rise development.

Dodge heads to The Carrington and finds the building abandoned and Val tied up. Nixon chases Dodge to the rooftop and in the ensuing fight, Dodge falls off and hangs from the ledge. Nixon prepares to kill him by stabbing his hand, but he sees the sun rise, puts his weapon away, and politely helps Dodge back on his feet. Nixon congratulates him for a good game before walking away. Val reunites with Dodge, who gets a final call from Miles telling him that he has won the game and the money. Miles receives a new file for the next prey.

Cast

Main
Liam Hemsworth as Dodge Tynes, the "prey" (season 1)
Sarah Gadon as Val, his wife (season 1)
Christoph Waltz as Miles Sellars, the hunt organizer
David Castañeda as Victor Suero (season 2)

Recurring
Zach Cherry as Looger, Dodge's friend
Aaron Poole as Connell, one of Miles' subordinates in charge of watching Dodge
Chris Webster as Nixon, a hunter
Billy Burke as Reagan, a hunter
Jimmy Akingbola as Carter, a hunter
Natasha Liu Bordizzo as Kennedy, a hunter
Patrick Garrow as LBJ, a hunter
Carolina Bartczak as Wife from baseball game

Episodes

Season 1 (2020)

Season 2 (2023)

Reception 
On Rotten Tomatoes, season one has a 57% rating with an average score of 6.20 out of 10 based on 30 reviews. The site's critical consensus read, "Most Dangerous Game's early episodes play it too safe, but its timely twist on a classic tale and a delicious turn from Christoph Waltz inspire hope that fun could be afoot yet."

Accolades

See also 
 Adaptations of The Most Dangerous Game

References

External links 
 

2020s American drama television series
2020 American television series debuts
English-language television shows
American drama web series
American action television series
Quibi original programming
Television series by CBS Studios
Television shows about death games
Television shows set in Detroit